At Home is the second studio album by Dutch rock band Shocking Blue, released in 1969 on the Pink Elephant label. It is their first album to feature Mariska Veres, the group's signature frontwoman and lead singer.

Overview
The album is the group's first record with singer Mariska Veres. Robbie van Leeuwen acquired Veres in an attempt to ape the form of the female-fronted Jefferson Airplane. With Veres's notable vocal performance and stunning looks, the band finally had an adequate frontwoman. 

At Home was a mixture of influences ranging from pop rock to psychedelic rock. There is also early evidence of their interest in Americana, with tracks like "California Here I Come" and "Harley Davidson". 

The hit single "Venus" was omitted from the original dutch pressings of the album, but was appended to the international versions both as an opening or closing track to the side one. Singles "Long and Lonesome Road" and "Mighty Joe" were also featured on several versions of the album.

At Home was repackaged for the American market as a self titled album rearranging tracklisting, omitting "I'll Write Your Name Through the Fire" and including singles of that period. 

Since the first reissue of At Home in 1989 "Venus" and "Long and Lonesome Road" were constantly present on the main tracklistings, both on CD and LP. Additional CD bonus tracks were the b-sides of that period.

Uses in media and cover versions
The John Mayer version of the song "Acka Raga" was used as the theme song for the BBC1 quiz show Ask the Family.

The track "Love Buzz" gained notoriety when it was covered by grunge band Nirvana.

Track listing
All songs were written by Robbie van Leeuwen, except for "Acka Raga" by John Mayer.

Original version
Side one
"Boll Weevil" – 2:40
"I'll Write Your Name Through the Fire"– 2:50
"Acka Raga" – 3:10
"Love Machine" – 3:15
"I'm a Woman" – 3:00

Side two
"California Here I Come" – 3:15
"Poor Boy" – 4:50
"Love Buzz" – 3:40
"The Butterfly and I" – 3:50

American The Shocking Blue version
Side one
"Long and Lonesome Road" – 2:44
"Love Machine" – 3:15
"The Butterfly and I" – 3:50
"Venus" - 3:07
"California Here I Come" – 3:15
"Poor Boy" – 4:50

Side two
"Mighty Joe" – 3:04
"Boll Weevil" – 2:40
"Acka Raga" – 3:10
"Love Buzz" – 3:40
"I'm a Woman" – 3:00
"Send Me a Postcard"– 2:33

Reissue edition  
"Boll Weevil" – 2:40
"I'll Write Your Name Through the Fire"– 2:50
"Acka Raga" – 3:10
"Love Machine" – 3:15
"I'm a Woman" – 3:00
"Venus" - 3:07
"California Here I Come" – 3:15
"Poor Boy" – 4:50
"Long and Lonesome Road" – 2:44
"Love Buzz" – 3:40
"The Butterfly and I" – 3:50
CD reissue bonus tracks

Personnel
 Mariska Veres - lead vocals
 Robbie van Leeuwen - guitar, sitar, backing vocals
 Klaasje van der Wal - bass guitar
 Cor van der Beek - drums

Studio musicians
Cees Schrama - keyboards

Charts

Certifications

References

1969 albums
Shocking Blue albums